CardUP is an American digital fundraising software for non-profit organizations. It was developed in response to the COVID-19 pandemic in the United States. The company was founded in March 2020 and is based in New York City.

Conception 
CardUP was founded in March 2020 by students at The Frisch School in Paramus, New Jersey (their high school was the first school in New Jersey to close as a result of the COVID-19 pandemic in that state).

See also 
 Crowdfunding
 Crowdsourcing

References 

Charity fundraising
COVID-19 pandemic in New Jersey